Acacia delicatula is a shrub of the genus Acacia and the subgenus Plurinerves that is endemic to northern Australia.

Description
Like most species of Acacia it has phyllodes rather than true leaves. It flowers between January and July producing simple inflorescences simple that appear singly or in pairs with spherical flower-heads that have a diameter of  containing 34 to 38 yellow coloured flowers.

Distribution
It is native to an area in the Kimberley region of Western Australia and the top end of the Northern Territory. It is usually situated on stony or rocky plateaux or hillslopes often in shrubland or open Eucalyptus savannah communities.

See also
List of Acacia species

References

delicatula
Acacias of Western Australia
Taxa named by Mary Tindale